SNAFU is the second studio album by the American pop rock girl band Potty Mouth. It was released on March 1, 2019, six years after their first album Hell Bent.

Track listing

Personnel
Potty Mouth
 Abby Weems – lead vocals, background vocals, guitar
 Ally Einbinder – bass
 Victoria Mandanas – drums, background vocals

Additional personnel
 Courtney Ballard – production

References

2019 albums
Pop albums by American artists
Pop rock albums by American artists